The Players All-Star Classic was a postseason college football all-star game, the only edition of which took place in 2012. The game was played in Little Rock, Arkansas, at War Memorial Stadium and was telecast by Comcast/Charter Sports Southeast and Cox Sports Television. The game provided seniors, from any level of college football, an opportunity to be seen by scouts in advance of the 2012 NFL Draft.

Game results

Head coaches
2012 – Martin Bayless (North) and Kurt Schottenheimer (South)

MVPs
 2012 – Michael Smith (RB, Utah State)

See also
List of college bowl games

References

External links
  from February 2012 via Wayback Machine
 

College football all-star games
American football in Arkansas